The Estonian Apostolic Orthodox Church (EOC) is an Orthodox church in Estonia under the direct jurisdiction of the Ecumenical Patriarch of Constantinople. Under Estonian law it is the legal successor to the pre–World War II Estonian Orthodox Church, which in 1940 had over 210,000 faithful, three bishops, 156 parishes, 131 priests, 19 deacons, two monasteries, and a theological seminary; the majority of the faithful were ethnic Estonians. Its official name is the Orthodox Church of Estonia.

The current primate of the church is Stephanos, Metropolitan of Tallinn and all Estonia, elected in 1999.

History

Little is known about the history of the church in the area until the 17th and 18th centuries, when many Old Believers fled there from Russia to avoid the liturgical reforms introduced by Patriarch Nikon of Moscow.In the 18th and 19th centuries, Estonia was a part of the Russian Empire. In the 1850s a rumour spread that the Orthodox Church promised to provide everybody who converted to Orthodoxy a piece of land of their own somewhere in Russia. Some 65,000 Estonian peasants were converted to the Orthodox faith in the hope of obtaining land, and numerous Orthodox churches were built. Later, when the rumour turned out to be a hoax, a great part of the new Orthodox peasants returned to the Lutheran Church.

In the late 19th century, a wave of Russification was introduced, supported by the Russian hierarchy but not by the local Estonian clergy. The Cathedral of St. Alexander Nevsky in Tallinn and the Pühtitsa (Pukhtitsa) convent in Kuremäe in East Estonia were also built around this time.

Autonomy under the Moscow Patriarchate 
After the Republic of Estonia was proclaimed in 1918, the Patriarch of the Russian Orthodox Church, St. Tikhon, in 1920 recognised the Estonian Apostolic Orthodox Church (EAOC) as being autonomous (Resolution No. 1780), postponing the discussion of its autocephaly. Archbishop Aleksander Paulus was elected and ordained , head of the EAOC.

Prior to this, Soviet Russia had adopted a Marxist–Leninist ideology which held as an ideological goal the elimination of religion and its replacement with state atheism. In response, Patriarch Tikhon had excommunicated the Soviet leadership in 1918, leading to a period of intense persecution of the Russian Orthodox Church. In April 1922, Tikhon was imprisoned, and the Estonian clergy lost contact with the Moscow Patriarchate.

Transfer to the Ecumenical Patriarchate 
In September 1922 the Council of the Estonian Apostolic Orthodox Church petitioned the Patriarch of Constantinople, Meletius IV, to (1) transfer control of the Estonian church from the Russian Orthodox Church to the Patriarchate of Constantinople, and (2) clarify the Estonian church's canonical status. In 1923 the Patriarchate of Constantinople issued a tomos (ecclesiastical edict) which brought the EAOC under Constantinople's jurisdiction and granted it autonomy, but not full autocephaly.

Before 1941, one-fifth of the total Estonian population (who had been mostly Lutheran since the Reformation in the early 16th century when the country was controlled by the Teutonic Order) were Orthodox Christians under the Patriarchate of Constantinople. There were 158 parishes in Estonia and 183 clerics in the Estonian church.  There was also a Chair of Orthodoxy in the Faculty of Theology at the University of Tartu. There was a Pskovo-Pechorsky Monastery in Petseri, two convents—in Narva and Kuremäe, a priory in Tallinn and a seminary in Petseri. The ancient monastery in Petseri was preserved from the mass church destructions that occurred in Soviet Russia.

World War II
In 1940, Estonia was occupied by the Soviet Union, whose government undertook a general programme of the dissolution of all ecclesiastical independence within its territory. From 1942 to 1944, however, autonomy under Constantinople was temporarily revived. In 1945, a representative of the Moscow Patriarchate dismissed the members of the OCE synod who had remained in Estonia and established a new organisation, the Diocesan Council. Orthodox believers in occupied Estonia were thus subordinated to being a diocese within the Russian Orthodox Church.

Just before the second Soviet occupation in 1944 and the dissolution of the Estonian synod, the primate of the church, Metropolitan Aleksander, went into exile along with 21 clergymen and about 8,000 Orthodox believers. The Orthodox Church of Estonia in Exile with its synod in Sweden continued its activity according to the canonical statutes, until the restoration of Estonian independence in 1991. Before he died in 1953, Metr. Aleksander established his community as an exarchate under Constantinople. Most of the other bishops and clergy who remained behind were deported to Siberia. In 1958, a new synod was established in exile, and the church was organized from Sweden.

Inactive
In 1978, at the urging of the Moscow Patriarchate, the Ecumenical Patriarch declared the charter (tomos) of the Church, as granted in 1923, inoperative. The church ceased to exist until the breakup of the Soviet Union, when divisions within the Orthodox community in Estonia arose between those who claimed that the Moscow Patriarchate has no jurisdiction in Estonia and those who wished to return to the jurisdiction of Moscow. The dispute often took place along ethnic lines, as many Russians had immigrated to Estonia during the Soviet occupation. Lengthy negotiations between the two patriarchates failed to produce any agreement.

Reactivation

In 1993, the synod of the Orthodox Church of Estonia in Exile was re-registered as the legal successor of the autonomous Orthodox Church of Estonia, and on February 20, 1996, the Ecumenical Patriarch Bartholomew I formally reactivated the tomos granted to the OCE in 1923, restoring its canonical subordination to the Ecumenical Patriarchate. This action brought immediate protest from the Estonian-born Patriarch Alexei II of the Moscow Patriarchate, which regarded the Estonian church as being part of its territory. The Patriarch of Moscow temporarily removed the name of the Ecumenical Patriarch from the diptychs.

In this difficult situation, the Orthodox Church of Estonia received help and support from the Finnish Orthodox Church, especially from Archbishop Johannes (Rinne) of the Archdiocese of Karelia and All Finland and Auxiliary Bishop Ambrosius (Risto Jääskeläinen) of Joensuu. The Ecumenical Patriarchate decided that Archbishop Johannes and Bishop Ambrosius as well as pastor Heikki Huttunen from Espoo should be available to give help in the reconstruction of the newly restored church. Archbishop Johannes would temporarily act as a deputy metropolitan (1996–1999) of the Estonian Autonomous Church. 

An agreement was reached in which local congregations could choose which jurisdiction to follow. The Orthodox community in Estonia, which accounts for 16.15 percent of the total population, remains divided, with the majority of faithful (mostly ethnic Russians) remaining under Moscow. From a U.S. Department of State report released in November 2003, about 20,000 believers (mostly ethnic Estonians) in 60 parishes are part of the autonomous church, with 150,000 faithful in 31 parishes, along with the monastic community of Pühtitsa, paying allegiance to Moscow.

In 1999, the church received a resident hierarch, Metropolitan Stephanos (Charalambides) of Tallinn who had formerly been an auxiliary bishop under the Ecumenical Patriarchate's Metropolitan of France.

References

Sources
Blackwell Dictionary of Eastern Christianity, pp. 183–4
The Estonian Apostolic Orthodox Church by Ronald Roberson, a Roman Catholic priest and scholar.
This article incorporates text from the OrthodoxWiki. Please edit and expand it.

External links

 Former official website of the Estonian Apostolic Orthodox Church 
 Current official website of the Estonian Apostolic Orthodox Church 
Estonian Orthodox Church of Moscow Patriarchate 
 The History Files Churches of Estonia

Eastern Orthodoxy in Estonia
Christian organizations established in 1917
Eastern Orthodox organizations established in the 20th century
Eastern Orthodox Church bodies in Europe
Dioceses established in the 20th century
Ecumenical Patriarchate of Constantinople
1917 establishments in Estonia